In Control is the second studio album by the Dutch alternative rock band Nemesea. The album was recorded at Studio Spitsbergen, Netherlands. The album was mixed and mastered at Galaxy studios, Belgium. Mixing was done by Ronald Prent and mastering Darcy Proper.

Track listing
All music written by Hendrik Jan de Jong, Lyrics by Manda Ophuis and Hendrik Jan de Jong.

Personnel

Band members
 Manda Ophuis – vocals
 Hendrik Jan de Jong – guitars, producer
 Martijn Pronk - guitars
 Sonny Onderwater – bass
 Steven Bouma – drums

Additional musicians
 Jake Kongaika (Cubworld) - male vocals on "The Way I Feel"
 Jeroen Reitbergen - additional keyboards on "Never"
 Hans De Wild - additional keyboards on "The Way I Feel"

Production
Bauke van der Laaken, Ronald Molendijk - producers, engineers
Tony Platt - producer
Ronald Prent - producer, mixing
Darcy Proper - mastering

External links
 Album info on the official Nemesea website

References

2007 albums
Nemesea albums
Alternative rock albums by Dutch artists
Albums produced by Tony Platt